Pablo Flores is a Puerto Rican DJ, record producer, remixer and arranger.

Remixes for Gloria Estefan

 "Abriendo Puertas"
 "Bad Boy"
 "Bailando!'" (Special edition Megamix)
 "Betcha Say That"
 "Cherchez La Femme"
 "Como Me Duele Perderte"
 "Conga"
 "Corazón Prohibido"
 "Cuba Libre" (LP version)
 "Dr. Beat"
 "Falling in Love (Uh-Oh)"
 "Heaven's What I Feel"
 "Higher"
 "Hotel Nacional"
 "Hoy"
 "Language of Love" (LP version)
 "La Parranda"
 "Live for Loving You"
 "Mama Yo Can't Go" (LP version)
 "Megamix/Miami Hitmix"
 "Mi Tierra"

 "Music of My Heart" (with N'Sync)
 "No Me Dejes de Querer
 "Oye!"
 "Oye Mi Canto (Hear My Voice)"
 "Party Time!" (Special edition Megamix)
 "Primitive Love" (LP version)
 "Prisoner of Love"
 "Santo Santo" (with So Pra Contrariar)
 "Suave" (LP version "Cobra" Soundtrack)
 "Reach"
 "Rhythm Is Gonna Get You"
 "Te Amaré"
 "Tradición"
 "Turn The Beat Around"
 "Tres Deseos
 "You'll Be Mine (Party Time)"
 "Wrapped"
 "Wepa"

Other remixes

Albita 
 "Chico Chévere"

Alejandro Fernández
 "Háblame"

Alejandro Ibarra 
 "Quiero Contigo"

Alejandro Sanz 
 "Quisiera"

Amanda Miguel 
 "No Te Vayas A Morir"
 "Ojos De Alquitrán"

Amistades Peligrosas 
 "Está Yayó"

Angelique 
 "I'm Free"

Arrow 
 "Limbo Calypso"

Azucar Moreno 
 "Olé"
 "Oye Como Vá"

Backstreet Boys
"The One"

Barry Manilow
 "Hey Mambo"

Carlos Ponce
 "Amiga Sombra"
 "Escuchame"
 "Mujer Con Pantalones"
 "Recuerdo"
 "Rezo"

Carlos Vives
 "Carito"
 "Déjame Entrar"
 "El Amor de Mi Tierra"
 "Fruta Fresca"
 "La Gota Fria"
 "Luna Nueva"
 "Megamix"
 "Pa' Maité"
 "Papadio"
 "Tu Amor Eterno"

Celia Cruz
 "Sazón"

Cerrone (Kongas) 
 "Africanism" (feat. Donna Allen)

Chantelle 
 "Paradise"

Chayanne
 "Este Ritmo Se Baila Asi"
 "Guajira"
 "Pata Pata"
 "Por Esa Mujer"
 "Salome"
 "Simon Sez"
 "Soleil, Soleil"
 "Solo Traigo Ritmo"

Cheito Quiñones 
 "El Baile De La Vela"

Chichi Peralta
 "Amor Narcótico"

Christina Aguilera
 "Genio Atrapado"

Daiquirí feat. Celi Bee 
 "Mi Tumbao"

Daniel René 
 "I Take It Back"

Daniela Mercury
 "Perla Negra"

Dany Brillant 
 "La Queue Du Chat"

David Lee Roth
 "Cuban Coffee"
 "Living in America"

Deep Forest
 "Madazulu"

Donato Y Estéfano 
 "Y Bailo"

Ednita Nazario
 "Tres Deseos"

Elvis Crespo
 "Wow Flash"

Emmanuel
 "Bella Senora"
 "Jarro Pichao"
 "La Chica De Humo"
 "Magdalena"
 "Mega Mix 1992"
 "No He Podido Verte"

Ernesto D'Alessio 
 "Cambiaré"

Federico De La Vega 
 "Cielo"

Florivonne 
 "Mony Mony"

Garibaldi 
 "Dame Un Beso"
 "Los Hijos De Buda"

Gian Marco
 "Se Me Olvidó"

Gipsy Kings
 "Hotel California"

Ilegales
 "Beat it With Your Rhythm Stick"
 "Chocolate" (LP Track Producer)

Jennifer Lopez
 "If You Had My Love"
 "I'm Real"
 "Let's Get Loud" (LP version)
 "No Me Ames" (with Marc Anthony)
 "Una Noche Mas"
 "Waiting For Tonight"

Jon Secada
 "Stop" / "Así"
 "Whipped"

Jon Secada & Ana Gabriel 
 "Quiero Vivir La Vida Amándote" (Theme from "Zorro")

José Luis Rodríguez
 "Agárrense De Las Manos"
 "Amalia Rosa"
 "Jump In The Line" (LP track co-producer)
 "La Fiesta"
 "Se Ve Y Se Va" (LP track co-producer)

Juan Luis Guerra
 "Bilirrubina"
 "De Tu Boca"
 "Guavaberry"

Julia Fordham
 "Genius"

Julio Iglesias
 "A Caña Y A Café"
 "Gozar La Vida"
 "La Gota Fria"
 "Mal Acostumbrado"
 "Me Ama Mo"
 "Milonga Sentimental"

Kairo 
 "Espejos De Un Café"

Kassav 
 "Leve Tet Ou"
 "O Madiana"

Lisa M
 "Everybody Dancing Now"
 "Vengo Alborotá" (LP Remixer)

Lissette 
 "Mama"

Lola Flores
 "Ay Alvariño"

Lou Briel
 "Se Como Duele"
 "Solo Yo"

Luis Enrique
 "Por Tu Amor"

Luis Miguel
 "Girl in a Sports Car"

Madonna
 "Buenos Aires"
 "Don't Cry For Me Argentina"

Mandy Moore
 "One Sided Love" (co-composer / co-producer)

Magneto
 "Amor Salado"
 "Eva Maria"
 "Mega Mix 1991"
 "Mira Mira Mira"
 "Sigue Sigue"
 "Sugar Sugar"
 "Vuela Vuela"

Marc Anthony
 "I Need To Know"

MDO
 "Groove With Me Tonight"

Mijares 
 "No Me Esperes Más"

Moisés Angulo 
 "Avelina"

MSM 
 "Domíname" (LP track co-writer / co-producer)
 "I'm the Only One"
 "Sobe Son" (LP track)

Myriam Hernandez
 "Leña y Fuego" (LP Track)

No U Turn 
 "I Still Love You"

NSYNC
 "Music of My Heart (featuring Gloria Estefan)"

Olga Tañón
 "Megamix"
 "Ran Kan Kan" (with Tito Puente)

Orquesta De Acordeones De Puerto Rico 
 "La Boricua"

Paul Anka
 "She's A Lady"

Phil Collins
 "Wear My Hat"

Rabanes
 "Everybody"

Raphael
 "Tarántula"

Ricardo Montaner
 "Vamos Pa' La Conga"

Ricky Martin
 "Dime Que Me Quieres"
 "Donde Estarás"
 "Jaleo"
 "Juramento" / "The Way To Love"
 "La Bomba"
 "Livin' La Vida Loca"
 "Loaded"
 "María"
 "Por Arriba Por Abajo"
 "Que Dia Es Hoy"
 "The Cup of Life" "La Copa De La Vida"
 "She Bangs"
 "She's All I Ever Had" / "Bella"

Ricky Martin & Madonna
 "Be Careful"

Rubén Blades
 "Baby's in Black"
 "Caminando"
 "West Indian Man"

Sergio Vargas
 "Bamboleo"

Shakira
 "Ciega, Sordomuda"
 "¿Dónde Estás Corazón?"
 "No Creo"
 "Ojos Asi" (co-composer / co-producer)
 "Te Dejo Madrid"

Simone
 "Beija Me Beija"

Soluna 
 "Bring it To Me"

Sophi 
 "This is Our Love (Asi Es El Amor)"

Sophy de Puerto Rico
 "Así No Te Amará Jamás"
 "Marinero"
 "No Es Fácil"
 "No Lo Dejes Caer"
 "No Soy Como Tú"
 "Se Ve Y Se Va"
 "Te Equivocas"
 "Tu Tienes La Culpa"

Spice and Co. 
 "Dance Across the Seas" (LP co-producer)
 "Round & Round"
 "Shake it Up Baby"

Thalía
 "Echa Pa'lante" (co-composer / co-producer)
 "Entre el mar y una estrella"
 "I Want You"
 "Piel morena"

Tito Puente (with Olga Tañón) 
 "Ran Kan Kan" (from "The Mambo Kings")

Unikko 
 "Muévete"

Various Artists 
 "Non-Stop Music" Mix LP

Vatikano 
 "Ojos Verdes"

Vitamin C
 "Me, Myself & I"

Will Smith
 "La Fiesta"
 "Miami"

Wilkins
 "Margarita"

Words 4 2 
 "Society Killed By Who"

Yolandita Monge
 "Fuiste un Sueño"
 "Mega Mix 1991"
 "No Me Acostumbro"
 "Por Ti"
 "Viviré Sin Ti"

Yuri
 "Asi Es La Vida"
 "El Apagón"

References

External links
 Pablo Flores at Discogs

Club DJs
Remixers
American dance musicians
American DJs
American house musicians
American people of Puerto Rican descent
Living people
Electronic dance music DJs
Year of birth missing (living people)
Musicians from San Juan, Puerto Rico